Eupithecia nervosa is a moth in the family Geometridae. It is found in Nepal.

The wingspan is about 21 mm. The forewings are pale brownish grey and hindwings are light greyish brown.

References

Moths described in 2010
nervosa
Moths of Asia